Halsey Street may refer to the following:

Halsey Street, in Downtown Newark, NJ
Halsey Street (BMT Canarsie Line), serving the  train in Brooklyn, NY
Halsey Street (BMT Jamaica Line), serving the  train in Brooklyn, NY
Halsey Street, a novel by Naima Coster